João Soares Almeida may refer to:
João Soares Almeida Filho (born 1954), Brazilian footballer
João Soares de Almeida Neto (born 1980), Brazilian footballer